Olivier Clergeau (born 15 June 1969) is a French modern pentathlete. He represented France at the 2000 Summer Olympics held in Sydney, Australia in the men's modern pentathlon and he finished in 8th place.

References

External links 
 
 

1969 births
Living people
French male modern pentathletes
Olympic modern pentathletes of France
Modern pentathletes at the 2000 Summer Olympics